Syed Rafiullah Khan, was a Faujdar of Mughal Bengal's Sylhet Sarkar.  He was the successor of Inayetullah Khan. Rafiullah Khan's office was in AD 1693 according to Syed Murtaza Ali, although it is not known how long his office was. His office took place during the reign of Emperor Aurangzeb and governorship of Subahdar Ibrahim Khan II. Rafiullah granted some land to Vaisakha Vaishnavi in Atuajan Pargana and also to Sonaram Vaishnav, whose heir was Darpanarayan Vaishnav, in Sik Sonaita Pargana. He was succeeded by Faujdar Ahmad Majid.

See also
History of Sylhet
Lutfullah Shirazi

References

Rulers of Sylhet
17th-century rulers in Asia
17th-century Indian Muslims